Nostell Miners Welfare Football Club is an English football club based in New Crofton, West Yorkshire.

History
Prior to the current club, a team under the name of Nostell Colliery Football Club played in the village during the 1890s and early 1900s; the team won the Wakefield and District League during this period.

The current club Nostell Miners Welfare Football Club was founded in 1928, after the purchasing of a plot of land to play on for £400, the location which they remain at today. The club won the Wakefield and District League during the 1937–1938 season.

Play was halted for World War II, but when the club returned they were successful in several colliery football competitions. In the late 1950s, the club toured Belgium and won a trophy on their tour. In the late 1960s, Nostell Miners Welfare continued their success in the Wakefield area eventually been brought up to the West Yorkshire League.  The 1966–67 season was a successful one for the club, as they won the West Yorkshire League and cup double.

By the early 1970s, they were once again playing in the Wakefield and District League. After a period of rebuilding of their squad, the club managed to regain the success of previous years and were promoted to the West Yorkshire League in 1982.

The club worked their way up to the West Yorkshire League Premier Division to begin a successful period in their history. Alan Colquhoun took over as manager in the late 1990s, helping the club gradually improve in the league, becoming champions in 2004–05. They also appeared in the cup finals three consecutive times.

They finished well during the 2005–06 season, and, as champions Leeds Metropolitan Carnegie were not applicable for promotion, Nostell Miners Welfare along with A.F.C. Emley were promoted to the Northern Counties East Football League Division One and won promotion to the Premier Division the following season. This is the highest the club has ever been in their history.

On 28 April 2009, Nostell won the Northern Counties East Football League Presidents Cup final against Scarborough Athletic, away at Bridlington, winning 3–2 on aggregate.

In October 2016 Nostell appointed Chris Ellerby as Manager who was previously with Halifax Irish FC in the West Riding County Amateur League. Ellerby has made a host of signings bringing players such as Jonathan Irving, Antony Brown, Matthew Thompson, Billy Grogan, Leon Hurles-Brook and Tim Wallace.

Season-by-season record

Honours
West Yorkshire League Premier Division
Champions: 2004–05
NCEL Presidents Cup
Winners: 2008–09

Club records
Highest attendance — 378 v. Scarborough Athletic, NCEL President's Cup Final First Leg, 16 April 2009

References

External links
Official website

Football clubs in England
Football clubs in West Yorkshire
Sport in the City of Wakefield
Association football clubs established in 1928
1928 establishments in England
Mining in West Yorkshire
Mining association football teams in England
Sheffield & Hallamshire County FA members
Wakefield and District Football Association League
West Yorkshire Association Football League
Northern Counties East Football League